Ivan Krastev Tanev (born May 1, 1957 in Sofia) is a former hammer thrower from Bulgaria, who competed  for his native country at two consecutive Summer Olympics, starting in 1988. He set his personal best (82.08 metres) in 1988.

Achievements

References
sports-reference

1957 births
Living people
Bulgarian male hammer throwers
Athletes (track and field) at the 1988 Summer Olympics
Athletes (track and field) at the 1992 Summer Olympics
Olympic athletes of Bulgaria
Sportspeople from Sofia